Adrián Ezequiel Richeze Araquistain (born 29 April 1989) is an Argentine cyclist, who currently rides for UCI Continental team . His brothers Roberto, Maximiliano and Mauro are also cyclists.

Major results
2014
 2nd  Team pursuit, South American Games
2015
 2nd  Team pursuit, Pan American Games
2016
 2nd Road race, National Road Championships
2018
 9th Overall Vuelta Ciclista del Uruguay
1st Stage 1
2019
 1st Stage 7 Vuelta Ciclista del Uruguay

References

External links

Living people
1989 births
Argentine male cyclists
Cyclists from Buenos Aires
Cyclists at the 2015 Pan American Games
Pan American Games medalists in cycling
Pan American Games silver medalists for Argentina
Medalists at the 2015 Pan American Games